Lexx originally aired on Citytv from April 18, 1997 to April 26, 2002. Over the series run, 61 episodes aired, with the first four being 90-minute TV movies and the remainder being 45-minute television episodes.

Series overview

Summary
Season One debuted in Canada on April 18, 1997 on Citytv and consists of four two-hour TV movies (sometimes screened as eight one-hour episodes) following the crew of the Lexx as they escape from the Cluster and encounter planets. When Sci Fi obtained the rights to broadcast the series in the United States, it changed the title to Tales from a Parallel Universe. Some episode guides do not list the two-hour movies as a season but list the subsequent seasons as the first through third.

Season Two debuted in Canada on December 11, 1998 on Space and consists of twenty forty-five-minute episodes with a story arc concerning the evil scientist Mantrid who tries to convert all matter in the Light Zone into one-armed drones. Mantrid largely succeeds before he is defeated by the crew of the Lexx, but not without causing a Big Crunch that results in sending the Lexx through a singularity to the Dark Zone.

Season Three debuted in the United Kingdom on February 6, 2000 on the British Sci-Fi Channel, and consists of thirteen episodes in which the Lexx is trapped in orbit around the warring planets Fire and Water, and the crew encounters an enigmatic, cheerful, and evil being known as Prince. The two planets share an orbit and atmosphere, allowing the inhabitants to pass freely between them. Fire is the afterlife for all evil souls, the inhabitants of which are continually engaged in attacks on Water, which is the afterlife of all good souls. The rulers of Fire are Prince and Duke, who both reincarnate whenever it suits them. Water has no ruler and contains a small population of hedonists on floating islands.

Season Four debuted in the USA on July 13, 2001 on the Sci-Fi Channel, and consists of twenty four episodes in which the Lexx arrives at Earth in the early 2000s, only to find that Prince (now named Isambard Prince and head of the ATF) and several other old adversaries have arrived there as well. Under the control of different individuals, the Lexx destroys large chunks of Earth and the solar system before the final episode, televised on April 26, 2002.

Episodes

Season 1 (1997)

Season 2 (1998–99)

Season 3 (2000)

Season 4 (2001–02)

References

External links

Lists of comedy-drama television series episodes
Lists of science fiction television series episodes
Lexx
Lists of Canadian television series episodes